Julio César Vaccari (born 9 July 1980) is an Argentine football manager, currently in charge of Defensa y Justicia.

Career
Vaccari was a Physical Education graduate at the Universidad del Salvador, and was in charge of lowly sides Atlético Paz and Círculo General Belgrano before joining Marcelo Bielsa's staff at Athletic Bilbao, as a video analyst. He followed Bielsa to Olympique de Marseille under the same role, before joining Gabriel Heinze's staff at Godoy Cruz in 2015, now as an assistant.

Vaccari continued to work as Heinze's assistant at Argentinos Juniors and Vélez Sarsfield. On 30 December 2020, he returned to the latter club after being named manager of the reserve team.

On 24 March 2022, Vaccari was named interim manager of Vélez, after Mauricio Pellegrino resigned. On 5 April, he was confirmed as the permanent first team manager.

On 13 September 2022, Vaccari replaced Sebastián Beccacece at the helm of Defensa y Justicia.

References

External links

1980 births
Living people
Argentine football managers
Athletic Bilbao non-playing staff
Olympique de Marseille non-playing staff
Argentine Primera División managers
Club Atlético Vélez Sarsfield managers
Defensa y Justicia managers
Argentine expatriate sportspeople in Spain
Argentine expatriate sportspeople in France